Stanki is a rural locality (a selo) in Mstyora Urban Settlement, Vyaznikovsky District, Vladimir Oblast, Russia. The population was 518 as of 2010. There are 14 streets.

Geography 
Stanki is located 14 km northwest of Vyazniki (the district's administrative centre) by road. Stavrovo is the nearest rural locality.

References 

Rural localities in Vyaznikovsky District
Vyaznikovsky Uyezd